Waupoos is a community in Prince Edward County, Ontario, Canada. Situated on Smith Bay on Lake Ontario, Waupoos is in the centre of the county's cider and wine industry. Located about 13 km from Picton, it is set among apple orchards, wineries, local farms and forested hills.

During and after the American Revolution, Waupoos served as a point of resettlement for American United Empire Loyalists. Prior to European settlement, Waupoos (whose name is derived from the Ojibwe waabooz, "rabbit") was inhabited by the Mississauga, and then later the Tyendinaga Mohawks, who created a burial ground on Waupoos Island. The Conrad David house, a historically designated property on which Sir John A. MacDonald once held the mortgage, now houses the County Cider Company. The Waupoos Estate Winery also makes its home in the hamlet of Waupoos.

References

External links
 - official tourism site

Communities in Prince Edward County, Ontario